Aïn Abid is a district in Constantine Province, Algeria. It was named after its capital, Ibn Ziad. As of the 1998 census, it is the least populated district in the province.

Municipalities
The district is further divided into 2 municipalities:
Ibn Ziad
Messaoud Boudjeriou

Districts of Constantine Province